Jake Lee Flannigan (born 2 February 1996) is an English professional footballer who plays as a defender or midfielder for Bognor Regis.

Career

Club career
He made his professional debut for Burton on 4 September 2018 in an EFL Trophy match against Walsall. Flannigan was released by Southampton in the summer 2019.

On 9 October 2019 Havant & Waterlooville F.C. announced that Flannigan had training with the club since the summer 2019 and that he had played on loan for Hampton & Richmond Borough F.C. on a one-month loan deal, before joining Havant & Waterlooville officially now. On 24 January 2020, he was sent out on loan for the second time, this time at Bognor Regis. The deal was extended until the end of the season in March 2020, and was then made permanent later in the year.

References

External links
Jake Flannigan at Aylesbury United

1996 births
Living people
English footballers
Association football defenders
Association football midfielders
Southampton F.C. players
Burton Albion F.C. players
Havant & Waterlooville F.C. players
Hampton & Richmond Borough F.C. players
Bognor Regis Town F.C. players